Jatinder Pannu is a journalist, columnist and social activist from Punjab, India.
He is the editor of Nawan Zamana, a political and social newspaper in the Punjabi language published from Jalandhar.

Prime Asia Television
Jatinder Pannu is currently prime host with Prime Asia Television. Most of the viewers of his shows are Punjabi diaspora in Canada, UK, USA, New Zealand, and Australia who watch his shows via YouTube. Prime Asia TV have over 1.5 million subscribers as of April 2020

References

1954 births
Living people
Indian activist journalists
Indian newspaper editors